Ultimo mondo cannibale (English: Last Cannibal World; also known as Cannibal, Jungle Holocaust and The Last Survivor) is a 1977 Italian cannibal exploitation film directed by Ruggero Deodato and written by Tito Carpi, Gianfranco Clerici and Renzo Genta. Starring Massimo Foschi, Me Me Lai and Ivan Rassimov, the plot follows a man trying to escape from a jungle island inhabited by a cannibal tribe.

It is the precursor to Deodato's notorious Cannibal Holocaust (1980), but was originally slated to be directed by Umberto Lenzi as a follow-up to his prototypical 1972 cannibal film Man from Deep River. While not prosecuted for obscenity, the film was seized and confiscated in the UK under Section 3 of the Obscene Publications Act 1959 during the video nasty panic.

Plot
Oil prospectors Rolf and Robert travel to an outpost in a jungle on the island of Mindanao. A rough landing damages the plane. Robert and Rolf find the abandoned remains of the original prospecting camp. They then find a rotting corpse and determine the prospectors were massacred by natives. Later, a member of the team, Swan, goes missing. The two prospectors and their pilot Charlie go into the jungle, and the pilot is killed by a booby trap resembling a large mace. Robert and Rolf then see Swan's remains being eaten by cannibals. After building a raft in order to float down the river to get back to the airfield, the men are separated when the raft is destroyed after traversing rapids. Robert, lost in the jungle, eats poisonous mushrooms, which cause him to vomit and pass out. He awakens to find himself being poked and prodded with large spears wielded by the cannibals.

Robert is then taken to a cave inhabited by the native tribe. He is tied to a rock and stripped down to his underwear by the natives. A native woman, Pulan, walks up to Robert and tears his underwear off. Two native men then walk up to Robert and pull on his penis, horrifying him. The natives then attach Robert to a pulley and bungee him from the top of the cave until he passes out.

Robert spends the next several days trapped in a small cave, abused by the natives and fed rotting offal. When asking Pulan for a bowl of water, she instead fondles him. He continues to observe the natives living their daily life, which includes eviscerating, cooking, and eating a large crocodile. Robert manages to escape with Pulan after killing two natives, and keeps her tied to a cord. The two wander through the jungle until Pulan tries escaping, after Robert becomes distracted pulling leeches off of his body while bathing in a lake. When Robert finds Pulan, he violently beats and rapes her.

The two then find Rolf, who has been living in a cave and whose leg is infected with gangrene. The three of them wander through the jungle until they eventually find the landing field. The cannibals then set upon them and kill, cook and consume Pulan. After Rolf is hit in the chest with a spear, Robert fights and kills one of the cannibals with a spear laced with cobra venom. Robert then eats the native's liver to frighten the other cannibals. Robert and Rolf then manage to make it to a plane and fly off, but Rolf dies from his chest injury soon after takeoff.

Cast
Massimo Foschi as Robert Harper
Me Me Lai as Pulan
Ivan Rassimov as Rolf
Sheik Razak Shikur as Charlie
Judy Rosly as Swan

Release

Controversy
The film was censored upon its initial theatrical release in the United Kingdom, with nearly four minutes of cuts, mainly directed to scenes of animal cruelty. In 2003, the film was allowed to release on DVD, but nearly three minutes of cuts were still required.

In Australia, the film was initially banned before being released on VHS with heavy cuts to remove "indecent violence"

Reception

Mike Long from DVD Talk gave the film two out of five stars, writing, "The problem with Jungle Holocaust is that beyond its shock value, it really doesn't offer anything else to the viewer." In his review, Long criticized the film for its lack of story, character development, and unconvincing gore effects. On his website Fantastic Movie Musings and Ramblings Dave Sindelar wrote, "Of the Italian cannibal movies I’ve seen to this point, this is easily the most savage and the nastiest; it is also better made than the others I’ve seen. However, since the whole genre is rather offensive, one almost wishes it was poorly made so one could discard it; as it is, like it or not, the movie does have a certain power to it."

References

External links
 
 
 

1977 films
1970s exploitation films
1977 horror films
Cannibal-boom films
Films directed by Ruggero Deodato
Films shot in the Philippines
1970s Italian-language films
Italian horror films
1970s Italian films